St. Augustine Water Works is a national historic site located at 184 San Marco Avenue, St. Augustine, Florida in St. Johns County. Completed in 1898,  in 1928 it was converted to a community center.

It was added to the National Register of Historic Places on February 5, 2014.

References

National Register of Historic Places in St. Johns County, Florida
St. Augustine, Florida